CT, or the Corporation Trust Company, is a wholly owned subsidiary of Wolters Kluwer, a multi-national information services company based in the Netherlands with operations in more than 35 countries. CT Corporation is the largest registered agent service firm in the world representing hundreds of thousands of business entities worldwide. It provides software and services that legal professionals use.  As a provider of registered agent services the company is not responsible for the business or legal affairs of the customers it serves.

History
The company now known as CT Corporation has been in the registered agent business since its founding in New Jersey in 1892 with only 44 employees. The original charter of the company was handwritten and stated that its purpose was "to carry on a general agency business, especially the acting as an agent of and trustee for corporations".

In 1895, what was then the Corporation Trust Company began assisting lawyers with the details of incorporating and qualifying corporations in all states and territories. They opened their first office in New York City in 1899. In 1955, they exceeded 75,000 units of statutory representation (including domestic and foreign units).

Notables 

 In 1995 CT Corporation and Commerce Clearing House (CCH) were acquired by Wolters Kluwer, a multi-national information services company based in the Netherlands with operations in 26 countries. CT becomes a sister company of CCH within the Wolters Kluwer organization.
 In 2002 CT acquired Business Filings, Inc., an online incorporation firm based in Madison, Wisconsin. The terms of the deal were not disclosed. The company is now known as BizFilings.
 CT announces its reorganization in 2006 into four business units: Compliance & Governance, UCC Solutions, Litigation Solutions, and Trademark Solutions. CT now includes CT Corporation, CT Lien Solutions, CT Summation, CT TyMetrix and CT Corsearch. In 2018, CT Corsearch was sold to Audax Private Equity and became an independent company.
 In 2006, after being acquired by Wolters Kluwer in 2004, Summation Legal Technologies becomes CT Summation joining CT TyMetrix in CT Corporation's Litigation Solutions group.
 CT has more than 800 employees in 46 cities nationwide. CT Corporation is the largest registered agent service company in the world.
 As of January, 2007, CT Corporation represented 227,459 business entities in Delaware and over 16,663 active entities in Nevada.
 CT Corporation's registered-agent service in Delaware is at the Corporation Trust Center at 1209 North Orange Street which is famous for being the home of thousands of companies due to Delaware's incorporation laws.

References

External links

CT Corporation — Official CT Corporation Website

Legal software
Legal software companies
Business services companies of the United States
Companies based in New York City
1892 establishments in New Jersey
American companies established in 1892